Heterobrenthus texanus is a species of primitive weevil in the beetle family Brentidae. It is found in North America.

References

Further reading

 
 
 

Brentidae
Articles created by Qbugbot
Beetles described in 1915